In association football, a cap is traditionally awarded in international football to a player making an official appearance for their national team. In total, over 600 players have played in 100 or more international matches. The record is held jointly by Bader Al-Mutawa of Kuwait and Cristiano Ronaldo of Portugal, who both made their 196th appearance in 2022.

The record was previously held by Soh Chin Ann of Malaysia, with 195 of his 222 appearances being ratified as official. The discrepancy is due to FIFA, the international football governing body, not recognising matches such as those within the Olympic Games and those not categorised as 'A' matches. The first men's footballer to play in 100 international matches was Billy Wright of England in 1959, finishing with 105 caps.

Men's footballers with 100 or more international caps 

 Players that are still active with their national teams are highlighted in bold.
 This list is sorted by FIFA's recognition of international caps, discounting appearances in matches that do not adhere to FIFA's definition of an international 'A' match.

Notes
 Australia joined the AFC from the OFC on 1 January 2006 when Mark Schwarzer had 36 caps and Tim Cahill had 14 caps.
Fandi Ahmad, Ismail Al-Ajmi, Marvin Andrews, Bashar Bani Yaseen, Lakhdar Belloumi, József Bozsik, Durrant Brown, David Chabala, Godfrey Chitalu, Choi Soon-ho, Alex Chola, Hans-Jürgen Dörner, Rashid Al-Dosari, Max Gradel, Falah Hassan, Ari Hjelm, Atiba Hutchinson, Sayed Mahmood Jalal, Raúl Jiménez, Emmanuel Kundé, Grzegorz Lato, Hassan Maatouk, Borislav Mihaylov, Haitham Mustafa, Mrisho Ngasa, Felix Nyirongo, Morten Olsen, Piyapong Pue-on, Hosny Abd Rabo, Ahmed Radhi, Donovan Ricketts, Hussein Saeed, Abdulwahab Al-Safi, Joachim Streich, Jermaine Taylor, Andris Vaņins, Harold Wallace, Godfrey Walusimbi, Andy Williams, Rabie Yassin and Talal Yousef have all appeared in 100 or more games for their nations, however some of these caps are not recognised as official by FIFA, and do not reach the 100 cap threshold required to be included in this table.

Players by nation

Players by confederation 

Notes
The most capped men's footballer from the OFC is Ivan Vicelich of New Zealand with 88 caps.

See also
List of top international women's football goalscorers by country
List of women's footballers with 100 or more international goals
List of women's footballers with 100 or more international caps
List of top international men's football goalscorers by country
List of men's footballers with 50 or more international goals
List of men's footballers with the most official appearances
List of men's footballers with 500 or more goals
Progression of association football caps record

Notes

References

 
Association football player non-biographical articles
International

Men's over 100 caps
Career achievements of association football players